Kansenshi Secondary School is a high school in central Ndola, Zambia, Southern Africa. It has about 1,500 pupils from grade 8 to 12.

History 
The school was built in the 1950s (to be confirmed) during the colonial period when Zambia was called Northern Rhodesia, and was called Llewellyn High School then. A laboratory was built at the school in 1953.

Following independence on 24 October 1964, the school was renamed Kansenji Secondary School in May 1965. 

In 1972 it was renamed Kansenshi Secondary School and is now called Kansenshi High School.

The school is located in the Kansenshi (previously called Kansenji) area of Ndola, in the Zambian Copperbelt Province. It has a wide catchment area.

Leadership
Willie Chokani was headmaster of the school from 1969 to 1980.

Notable alumni
Edwin Mbaso, footballer

References 

http://www.kansenshihighschool.net/?c=1

External links
https://archive.today/20150420221112/http://lyashi-001-site6.smarterasp.net/index.html
http://serveafrica.info/top-secondary-schools-in-zambia

Secondary schools in Zambia
Ndola
Buildings and structures in Copperbelt Province
Educational institutions established in the 1950s
1950s establishments in Northern Rhodesia